Thomas Hasal (born July 9, 1999) is a Canadian professional soccer player who plays as a goalkeeper for the Vancouver Whitecaps FC in Major League Soccer.

Early life 
Born in Cambridge, Ontario, Hasal moved with his family to Ottawa when he has a year old, where he began playing soccer at age five. He then moved to Calgary at age seven, Edmonton at age eight, and Saskatoon at age nine. He played with youth club Aurora SC in Saskatchewan for a year, later joining the Whitecaps FC Saskatchewan Academy Centre in 2013, and also played for the Saskatchewan provincial team in 2014 and 2015. In August 2016, he joined the Whitecaps Residency Academy and later joined the Vancouver Whitecaps FC U-23 developmental squad in 2018. In 2016, he led the U19 team to the Academy Championship semi-finals. In 2016 and 2017, he was named the Saskatchewan Soccer Association Male Youth Player of the Year.

Club career 
In March 2019, he signed a professional contract with Vancouver Whitecaps FC of Major League Soccer as a homegrown player through 2020, with club options for 2021 and 2022. Initially serving as the third-string goalkeeper, he made his debut on July 19, 2020, coming on as a substitute against the Seattle Sounders FC, early in the second half of an MLS is Back Tournament group stage match after an injury to Maxime Crépeau. He made his first start in the next match on July 23, keeping a clean sheet in a 2–0 victory. He led the team to the Round of 16, where they were defeated in penalty kicks by Sporting Kansas City, following a 0–0 draw, with Hasal finishing the tournament with no goals against in regulation. Despite the loss, he was named Man of the Match and was selected to the MLS Team of the Week. After the tournament, he was named a finalist for the MLS is Back Tournament Golden Glove, Best XI, and Save of the Tournament. Hasal would take over the starting role in Crepeau's absence, but would lose that role after suffering a fractured tibia and concussion, in September 2020. Following the return of Crepeau, Hasal began the 2021 season in a backup role.

In 2022, he extended his contract through the 2023 season, with club options for 2024 and 2025. Following the trade of starter Maxime Crepeau, Hasal began the 2022 season as the Whitecaps' first-choice goalkeeper. However, on May 8, he suffered a fractured finger, putting him out of action. On June 25, he joined the second team Whitecaps FC 2 in MLS Next Pro in their match against San Jose Earthquakes II in his first game back.

International career 
Hasal made his debut in the Canadian youth program in October 2016 when he was called up to the Canada U18 team. In 2017, he was called up to the  Canadian U20 team for a pair of friendly tournaments in January 2017, where he saved a penalty against El Salvador. He was then named to the roster for the 2017 CONCACAF U-20 Championship. At the CONCACAF Championship, he played every minute in Canada's three matches. He was then named to the roster for the 2018 CONCACAF U-20 Championship. In January 2020, Hasal was named to a camp with the Canada U23 team, before being named to the provisional roster for the 2020 CONCACAF Men's Olympic Qualifying Championship on February 26, 2020.

In November 2022, he was called up to the Canada senior team for the first time, ahead of a friendly against Bahrain, although he did not appear in the match.

Personal life 
Hasal is of Czech descent, both his parents are first generation emigrants from the Czech Republic. His grandfather František was a former goalkeeper and introduced Hasal to soccer.

Career statistics 
As of March 15, 2023

References

External links 

 

1999 births
Living people
Soccer people from Ontario
Sportspeople from Cambridge, Ontario
Canada men's youth international soccer players
Canada men's under-23 international soccer players
Canadian people of Czech descent
Canadian soccer players
Major League Soccer players
Vancouver Whitecaps FC players
Homegrown Players (MLS)
Association football goalkeepers
MLS Next Pro players
Whitecaps FC 2 players